DGD can refer to:
 Di-Gata Defenders, a 52 episode Canadian cartoon series that ran from 2006 to 2008
 Dance Gavin Dance, a musical group
 Dworkin's Game Driver, a MUD server software platform
 Differential group delay, a term from optics
 Development, Growth & Differentiation, a scientific journal